Śubhakarasiṃha (637-735 CE) was an eminent Indian Buddhist monk and master of Esoteric Buddhism, who arrived in the Chinese capital Chang'an (now Xi'an) in 716 CE and translated the , better known as the Mahāvairocana Sūtra. Four years later another master, Vajrabodhi (670-741 CE), and his pupil Amoghavajra (705-775 CE), would arrive and proceeded to translate other scriptures, thus establishing a second esoteric tradition. Along with these other masters, Śubhakarasiṃha was responsible for bringing Esoteric Buddhism to the height of its popularity in China.

Life in India

According to the Chinese sources, Śubhakarasiṃha was born in India as the oldest son of Buddhakara (Fo-shou Wang). Li Hua's Shan-wu-wei-hsing-chuang states that his family originated in Magadha. Because of unrest in their native kingdom, they had migrated to Odra (in present-day Odisha). Modern scholars theorize that Śubhakarasiṃha may have been an ancestor of the Bhauma-Kara dynasty, which ruled in Odisha between 8th and 10th centuries, and whose kings included people named Śubhakara.

According to his biography, Śubhakarasiṃha ascended to the throne as king when he was thirteen years old. Although emerging victorious from a power struggle with his older brothers, he turned over his position to his oldest brother and entered the monastic life. He became well known for his supernatural abilities, and finally settled in Nālandā where he met the master Dharmagupta. After being instructed by him, Śubhakarasiṃha became a traveling teacher, and was then told by Dharmagupta to go further east to China.

Life in China
When Śubhakarasiṃha arrived in China, he was already eighty years old. Upon his arrival, he became well known for his supernatural abilities, and became favored by Emperor Xuanzong of the Tang Dynasty.

With Yixing
According to Robert Sharf, Chán Master Yi Xing (Ch. 一行禅師) was the most eminent of his students. Yixing belonged to the northern school of Chán Buddhism, but this was not seen by Chinese Buddhist culture as being fundamentally different from the esoteric teachings of Śubhakarasiṃha. Around the turn of the eighth century, the northern school was known for its esoteric practices of dhāraṇīs and mantras.

In Shingon Buddhism
Śubhakarasiṃha was the first patriarch of the Shingon teachings in China.

References

Bibliography 

 
 
 

Vajrayana
Indian Buddhist monks
Indian Buddhist missionaries
Monks of Nalanda
8th-century Buddhist monks
Shingon Buddhism
Tendai
637 births
735 deaths
7th-century Indian monks
8th-century Indian monks